A religious brother is a member of a Christian religious institute or religious order who commits himself to following Christ in consecrated life of the Church, usually by the vows of poverty, chastity and obedience. He is a layman, in the sense of not being ordained as a deacon or priest, and usually lives in a religious community and works in a ministry appropriate to his capabilities. 

A brother might practice any secular occupation. The term "brother" is used as he is expected to be as a brother to others. Brothers are members of a variety of religious communities, which may be contemplative, monastic, or apostolic in character. Some religious institutes are composed only of brothers; others are so-called "mixed" communities that are made up of brothers and clerics (priests or ministers, and seminarians).

It is also common in many Christian groups to refer to other members as "brother" or "sister". In particular, the Christian Shakers use the title for all male adult members.

History
As monasticism developed in the early days of Christianity, most monks remained laymen, as ordination to ministry was seen as a hindrance to the monks' vocation to a contemplative life. Guided by the Rule of St. Benedict, the main lifestyle they followed was either agricultural or that of a desert hermit. Various forces and trends through the Middle Ages led to the situation where monks were no longer following this manner of living. Instead, they were focusing primarily on the religious obligations of intercessory prayer, especially for donors to the monasteries. This was encouraged by a spiritual reliance among the general membership of the Catholic Church upon the prayers of monastics to achieve salvation.

One practical consequence of this situation was that the bulk of the physical work which needed to be done for the simple survival of the monastic community came to be done by men who volunteered their services on a full-time basis, and who followed a less severe regimen of prayer. Called donates or oblati, they were not considered to be monks, but they were nonetheless gradually accepted as members of the monastic community.

In other communities, a separate labor force of "lay brothers" or conversi was cultivated in order to handle the temporal business of the abbey. These men were professed members of the community but were restricted to ancillary roles of manual labor. A rigid class system emerged from this arrangement in which the clerics (priests and seminarians) exercised complete control over the lay brothers. In some cases, lay brothers received little or no formal education, could neither hold office nor vote within their communities, and were forbidden from passing from the lay to the clerical state. In its worst form, this class system resulted in a master-slave relationship between clerics and lay brothers. This inequality between two groups of vowed religious men was not addressed by the institutional leadership of the Catholic Church until the Second Vatican Council.

In the 17th century, education of the poorer classes began to be seen as a means of providing charity, which had always been a mandate of Christianity. A leading figure of this approach was St. Jean Baptiste de la Salle, a canon of Reims cathedral, who began to help the poor children of the city. As he was gradually drawn into education as a means for this purpose, he established a new congregation of men for this work, who were called the Institute of the Brothers of the Christian Schools. De la Salle had initially intended the Institute to be composed of both ordained and lay members, but the death of the candidates he sent to Rome for ordination while en route convinced him to keep the Institute composed only of laymen. Thus the establishment of a recognized status of "brother" as other than an agricultural laborer came to emerge in the Church.

The social devastations of the 18th and 19th centuries saw the gradual emergence of other similar congregations of men, dedicated primarily to education. Other examples of such congregations are the Marist Brothers, the Brothers of Holy Cross, the Institute of the Brothers of the Christian Schools (also known as the De La Salle Brothers), Brothers of Christian Instruction of St Gabriel (Gabrielites) and the Congregation of Christian Brothers.

Anglicanism
In the Anglican Communion, the term "brother" is also used to refer to non-ordained members of a religious order, such as the Little Brothers of Francis.

Catholicism

Religious brothers today
The establishment of congregation of brothers started to boom during the 17th century such as the De La Salle Brothers.

Since the Second Vatican Council (1962–1965) many brothers have moved toward professional and academic occupations, especially in the areas of nursing, education, peace, and justice. Brothers in communities with priests and seminarians often undertake advanced studies and enjoy equal standing with ordained members. Today, most brothers such as in the United States serve in some type of professional, technical, or academic ministry. Many serve as chaplains or teachers/faculty members at schools and universities run by their respective orders. In addition, most brothers undertake some studies in spirituality, religious studies, and theology.

Today there are more opportunities than ever for brothers in the Church. Brothers can be members of congregations that are made up only of brothers or they may belong to so-called "mixed" communities that include seminarians and priests. These congregations may be primarily contemplative or apostolic in nature; many try to balance both aspects of religious life. Brothers in the United States and elsewhere have access to an advanced education that is suited to their interests and talents. In mixed communities, brothers may collaborate with seminarians and priests or may minister independently of them. Brothers share equal status and rights with seminarians and priests in their communities with the exception that canon law currently requires that mixed communities elect an ordained minister as provincial; however, some dispensations to this rule have been granted. Brothers may be elected to provincial councils and other leadership positions.

The most acceptable term currently for the brother's vocation is "religious brother", and the vocational title is "Brother," sometimes abbreviated as "Bro." or "Br." The generic use of the term "brother" to describe fraternal or spiritual relationships between men in communities can sometimes lead to confusion about what it means to be a "brother" (religious). According to canon law, brothers are neither "lay nor clerical" but instead belong to the religious state of life. Hence, the vocational title "brother" is generally not used by seminarians (other than in monastic or mendicant Orders) in order to avoid the impression that being a brother is a developmental phase of clerical formation. However, as equal members of the same community, both priests and brothers would consider themselves brothers in the fraternal, communal sense of the term.

The term "lay brother" is considered offensive by some brothers since the word "lay" was once interpreted in this context to mean "illiterate" or "uneducated". However, in canon law it simply means "not clerical" or "not ordained".

Religious brothers who have been proclaimed saints
Religious brothers who have been canonized as saints include:
Alphonsus Rodriguez, S.J., porter
Bernard of Corleone, O.F.M. Cap.
Conrad of Parzham, O.F.M. Cap.
Crispin of Viterbo, O.F.M. Cap.
Didacus of Alcalá
Felix of Cantalice, O.F.M. Cap., who was the first Capuchin friar to be canonized in the history of the Order
Francis Mary of Camporosso, O.F.M. Cap.
Gerard Majella, C.Ss.R.
Ignatius of Laconi, O.F.M. Cap.
St. John of God, Brothers Hospitallers of St. John of God
St. Juan Macias, Order of Preachers
Richard Pampuri, Brothers Hospitallers of St. John of God
Martin de Porres, Order of Preachers
André Bessette, C.S.C., Canadian founder of Saint Joseph's Oratory in Montreal
René Goupil, S.J. missionary and martyr/saint
Albert Chmielowski, Polish founder of a congregation of brothers and another of religious sisters of the Third Order Regular of Saint Francis, which both bear his name.
Bénilde Romançon, F.S.C., a French educator, who was the first member of his religious institute to be canonized
Martyrs of Turon, eight Spanish Brothers of the Christian Schools executed during the Spanish Civil War
Jaime Hilario, F.S.C., executed during the Spanish Civil War
Miguel Febres Cordero, F.S.C., an Ecuadorian educator
Mutien-Marie Wiaux, F.S.C., a Belgian educator
Paschal Baylon, O.F.M.

Religious brothers who have been beatified
Isidore De Loor, Passionist, a Belgian brother
Edmund Ignatius Rice, founder of the Congregation of Christian Brothers and Presentation Brothers
Dominic Collins, Society of Jesus
José Olallo, Brothers Hospitallers of St. John of God
Redemptus of the Cross, Order of Discalced Carmelites
Fra Angelico, Order of Preachers
Artémides Zatti, Society of St. Francis de Sales
István Sándor, Society of St. Francis de Sales
Henri Verges, Marist Brother

Lutheran
In Lutheran Churches, brothers are monastics or members of religious orders.

Methodism
In the Methodist Church, those who are called "Brothers" (Br.) are male monastics (e.g. votarists of Saint Brigid of Kildare Methodist-Benedictine Monastery) or members of a Methodist religious order (e.g. Order of Saint Luke).

Other uses of the term

Shakerism 
All male adult members of the Shakers use the title of "brother." In the past, male Shakers in leadership positions of communities used the title "father."

The Church of Jesus Christ of Latter-day Saints 
In the Church of Jesus Christ of Latter-day Saints, popularly known as Mormons, adults female and male are often referred to sisters and brothers respectively. The use is similar to Mr. or Mrs, therefore using the terms is not common among young single adults. 'As Latter-day Saints united by common beliefs, the terms Brother and Sister best describe our relationship'.

Jehovah's Witnesses 
All baptized members of Jehovah's Witnesses refer to other members in good standing as "brothers" and "sisters".

See also
Consecrated life
Vocational Discernment in the Catholic Church

References

Further reading 
 Blessed Ambiguity: Brothers in the Church. Landover: Christian Brothers, 1993. Michael Meister, F.S.C., ed. 
 Sixteen questions about church vocations, VISION Catholic Religious Vocation Network, http://www.vocation-network.org/articles/show/131
 The HarperCollins Encyclopedia of Catholicism, Richard P. McBrien, general ed. (Harper: San Francisco, 1995)
 Who Are My Brothers?: Cleric-Lay Relationships in Men's Religious Communities. Philip Armstrong, C.S.C., ed. New York: Society of St Paul, 1988.

External links
Religious Brothers Conference The national organization for religious brothers which holds an annual convention and serves as an advocacy group for issues relating to the brother vocation.
VocationNetwork.org information and free resources about Catholic religious vocations and institutes of consecrated life.
DigitalVocationGuide.org digital edition of VISION, the annual Catholic religious vocation discernment guide.
franciscan-brothers.net Congregation of Brothers of the Poor of St. Francis of Assisi.

Anglican orders and communities
Lutheran orders and societies

Organisation of Catholic religious orders
Christian terminology
Christian religious occupations